The  was a general army of the Imperial Japanese Army, established for the defense of eastern and northern Honshū (including the Tōkai and Kantō regions) during the final stage of the Pacific War.

History
The First General Army was established on April 8, 1945, with the dissolution of the General Defense Command into the First and Second General Army. Although its territory encompassed all of northern Japan, its primary mission was to ensure the security of the heavily populated Kantō region, which included Tokyo. Its forces consisted mostly of poorly trained and poorly armed reservists, conscripted students and home guard militia.

The First General Army remained active for several months after the surrender of Japan to help maintain public order until the arrival of the American occupation forces, and to oversee the final demobilization and dissolution of the Imperial Japanese Army.

Commanders

Commanding officer

Chief of Staff

See also
Armies of the Imperial Japanese Army

References

Books

External links

Army groups of Japan
Military units and formations established in 1945
Military units and formations disestablished in 1945